

Events

Pre-1600
106 – Start of the Bostran era, the calendar of the province of Arabia Petraea.
 235 – Roman emperor Severus Alexander is murdered, marking the start of the Crisis of the Third Century.
 871 – Æthelred of Wessex is defeated by a Danish invasion army at the Battle of Marton.
1185 – Battle of Yashima: the Japanese forces of the Taira clan are defeated by the Minamoto clan.
1312 – Vox in excelso: Pope Clement V dissolves the Order of the Knights Templar.
1508 – Ferdinand II of Aragon commissions Amerigo Vespucci chief navigator of the Spanish Empire.

1601–1900
1621 – The Pilgrims of Plymouth Colony sign a peace treaty with Massasoit of the Wampanoags.
1622 – Jamestown massacre: Algonquians kill 347 English settlers around Jamestown, Virginia, a third of the colony's population, during the Second Anglo-Powhatan War.
1631 – The Massachusetts Bay Colony outlaws the possession of cards, dice, and gaming tables.
1638 – Anne Hutchinson is expelled from Massachusetts Bay Colony for religious dissent.
1739 – Nader Shah occupies Delhi in India and sacks the city, stealing the jewels of the Peacock Throne.
1765 – The British Parliament passes the Stamp Act that introduces a tax to be levied directly on its American colonies.
1784 – The Emerald Buddha is moved with great ceremony to its current location in Wat Phra Kaew, Thailand.
1794 – The Slave Trade Act of 1794 bans the export of slaves from the United States, and prohibits American citizens from outfitting a ship for the purpose of importing slaves.
1829 – In the London Protocol, the three protecting powers (United Kingdom, France and Russia) establish the borders of Greece.
1849 – The Austrians defeat the Piedmontese at the Battle of Novara.
1871 – In North Carolina, William Woods Holden becomes the first governor of a U.S. state to be removed from office by impeachment.
1873 – The Spanish National Assembly abolishes slavery in Puerto Rico.
1894 – The Stanley Cup ice hockey competition is held for the first time, in Montreal, Canada.
1895 – Before the Société pour L'Encouragement à l'Industrie, brothers Auguste and Louis Lumière demonstrate movie film technology publicly for the first time.
1896 – Charilaos Vasilakos wins the first modern Olympic marathon race with a time of three hours and 18 minutes.

1901–present
1906 – The first England vs France rugby union match is played at Parc des Princes in Paris.
1913 – Mystic Phan Xích Long, the self-proclaimed Emperor of Vietnam, is arrested for organising a revolt against the colonial rule of French Indochina, which was nevertheless carried out by his supporters the following day.
1916 – Yuan Shikai abdicates as Emperor of China, restoring the Republic and returning to the Presidency.
1920 – Azeri and Turkish army soldiers with participation of Kurdish gangs attack the Armenian inhabitants of Shushi (Nagorno Karabakh).
1933 – Cullen–Harrison Act: President Franklin D. Roosevelt signs an amendment to the Volstead Act, legalizing the manufacture and sale of "3.2 beer" (3.2% alcohol by weight, approximately 4% alcohol by volume) and light wines.
  1933   – Nazi Germany opens its first concentration camp, Dachau.
1934 – The first Masters Tournament is held at Augusta National Golf Club in Georgia.
1939 – Germany takes Memel from Lithuania.
1942 – World War II: In the Mediterranean Sea, the Royal Navy confronts Italy's Regia Marina in the Second Battle of Sirte.
1943 – World War II: The entire village of Khatyn (in what is the present-day Republic of Belarus) is burnt alive by Schutzmannschaft Battalion 118.
1945 – World War II: The city of Hildesheim, Germany is heavily damaged in a British air raid, though it had little military significance and Germany was on the verge of final defeat.
  1945   – The Arab League is founded when a charter is adopted in Cairo, Egypt.
1946 – The United Kingdom grants full independence to Transjordan.
1960 – Arthur Leonard Schawlow and Charles Hard Townes receive the first patent for a laser.
1963 – The Beatles release their debut album Please Please Me. 
1972 – The United States Congress sends the Equal Rights Amendment to the states for ratification.
  1972   – In Eisenstadt v. Baird, the United States Supreme Court decides that unmarried persons have the right to possess contraceptives.
1975 – A fire at the Browns Ferry Nuclear Power Plant in Decatur, Alabama causes a dangerous reduction in cooling water levels.
1978 – Karl Wallenda of The Flying Wallendas dies after falling off a tight-rope suspended between two hotels in San Juan, Puerto Rico.
1982 – NASA's Space Shuttle Columbia is launched from the Kennedy Space Center on its third mission, STS-3.
1988 – The United States Congress votes to override President Ronald Reagan's veto of the Civil Rights Restoration Act of 1987. 
1992 – USAir Flight 405 crashes shortly after takeoff from New York City's LaGuardia Airport, leading to a number of studies into the effect that ice has on aircraft.
  1992   – Fall of communism in Albania: The Democratic Party of Albania wins a decisive majority in the parliamentary election.
1993 – The Intel Corporation ships the first Pentium chips (80586), featuring a 60 MHz clock speed, 100+ MIPS, and a 64 bit data path.
1995 – Cosmonaut Valeri Polyakov returns to earth after setting a record of 438 days in space.
1997 – Tara Lipinski, aged 14 years and nine months, becomes the youngest women's World Figure Skating Champion.
  1997   – Comet Hale–Bopp reaches its closest approach to Earth at 1.315 AU. 
2004 – Ahmed Yassin, co-founder and leader of the Palestinian Sunni Islamist group Hamas, two bodyguards, and nine civilian bystanders are killed in the Gaza Strip when hit by Israeli Air Force Hellfire missiles.
2006 – Three Christian Peacemaker Team (CPT) hostages are freed by British forces in Baghdad after 118 days of captivity and the murder of their colleague from the U.S., Tom Fox.
2013 – At least 37 people are killed and 200 are injured after a fire destroys a camp containing Burmese refugees near Ban Mae, Thailand.
2016 – Three suicide bombers kill 32 people and injure 316 in the 2016 Brussels bombings at the airport and at the Maelbeek/Maalbeek metro station.
2017 – A terrorist attack in London near the Houses of Parliament leaves four people dead and at least 20 injured.
  2017   – Syrian civil war: Five hundred members of the Syrian Democratic Forces (SDF) are airlifted south of the Euphrates by United States Air Force helicopters, beginning the Battle of Tabqa.
2019 – The Special Counsel investigation on the 2016 United States presidential election concludes when Robert Mueller submits his report to the United States Attorney General.
  2019   – Two buses crashed in Kitampo, a town north of Ghana's capital Accra, killing at least 50 people.
2020 – Indian Prime Minister Narendra Modi announces the country's largest ever self-imposed curfew, in an effort to fight the spread of COVID-19.
  2020   – Greek Prime Minister Kyriakos Mitsotakis announces a national lockdown and the country's first ever self-imposed curfew, in an effort to fight the spread of COVID-19.
2021 – Ten people are killed in a mass shooting in Boulder, Colorado.

Births

Pre-1600
 841 – Bernard Plantapilosa, Frankish son of Bernard of Septimania (d. 885)
 875 – William I, Duke of Aquitaine (d. 918)
1212 – Emperor Go-Horikawa of Japan (d. 1235)
1367 – Thomas de Mowbray, 1st Duke of Norfolk, English politician, Earl Marshal of the United Kingdom (probable; d. 1399)
1394 – Ulugh Beg, Persian astronomer and mathematician (d. 1449)
1459 – Maximilian I, Holy Roman Emperor (d. 1519)
1499 – Johann Carion, German astrologer and chronicler (d. 1537)
1503 – Antonio Francesco Grazzini, Italian author and educator (d. 1583)
1517 – Gioseffo Zarlino, Italian composer (d. 1590)
1519 – Catherine Brandon, Duchess of Suffolk, English noblewoman (d. 1580)
1582 – John Williams, Archbishop of York (d. 1650)
1599 – Anthony van Dyck, Flemish-English painter and etcher (d. 1641)

1601–1900
1609 – John II Casimir Vasa, Polish king (d. 1672)
1615 – Katherine Jones, Viscountess Ranelagh, British scientist (d. 1691)
1663 – August Hermann Francke, German clergyman, philanthropist, and scholar (d. 1727)
1684 – William Pulteney, 1st Earl of Bath, English politician, Secretary at War (d. 1764)
1712 – Edward Moore, English poet and playwright (d. 1757)
1720 – Nicolas-Henri Jardin, French architect, designed the Yellow Palace and Bernstorff Palace (d. 1799)
1723 – Charles Carroll, American lawyer and politician (d. 1783)
1728 – Anton Raphael Mengs, German painter and theorist (d. 1779)
1785 – Adam Sedgwick, English scientist (d. 1873)
1797 – William I, German Emperor (d. 1888)
1808 – Caroline Norton, English feminist, social reformer, and author (d. 1877)
  1808   – David Swinson Maynard, American physician and lawyer (d. 1873)
1812 – Stephen Pearl Andrews, American author and activist (d. 1886)
1814 – Thomas Crawford, American sculptor, designed the Statue of Freedom (d. 1857)
1817 – Braxton Bragg, American general (d. 1876)
1818 – John Ainsworth Horrocks, English-Australian explorer, founded Penwortham (d. 1846)
1822 – Ahmed Cevdet Pasha, Ottoman sociologist, historian, scholar, statesman and jurist (d. 1895)
1841 – Anastassios Christomanos, Greek scientist (d. 1906) 
1842 – Mykola Lysenko, Ukrainian pianist, composer, and conductor (d. 1912)
1846 – Randolph Caldecott, English illustrator and painter (d. 1886)
  1846   – James Timberlake, American lieutenant, police officer, and farmer (d. 1891)
1852 – Otakar Ševčík, Czech violinist and educator (d. 1934)
  1852   – Hector Sévin, French cardinal (d. 1916)
1855 – Dorothy Tennant, British painter (d. 1926)
1857 – Paul Doumer, French mathematician, journalist, and politician, 14th President of France (d. 1932)
1866 – Jack Boyle, American baseball player and umpire (d. 1913)
1868 – Robert Andrews Millikan, American colonel and physicist, Nobel Prize laureate (d. 1953)
1869 – Emilio Aguinaldo, Filipino general and politician, 1st President of the Philippines (d. 1964)
  1869   – Tom McInnes, Scottish-English footballer (d. 1939)
1873 – Ernest Lawson, Canadian-American painter (d. 1939)
1880 – Ernest C. Quigley, Canadian-American football player and coach (d. 1960)
1884 – Arthur H. Vandenberg, American journalist and politician (d. 1951)
  1884   – Lyda Borelli, Italian actress (d. 1959)
1885 – Aryeh Levin, Polish-Lithuanian rabbi and educator (d. 1969)
1886 – August Rei, Estonian lawyer and politician, Head of State of Estonia (d. 1963)
1887 – Chico Marx, American actor (d. 1961)
1890 – George Clark, American race car driver (d. 1978)
1892 – Charlie Poole, American country banjo player (d. 1931)
  1892   – Johannes Semper, Estonian poet and scholar (d. 1970)
1896 – He Long, Chinese general and politician, 1st Vice Premier of the People's Republic of China (d. 1969)
  1896   – Joseph Schildkraut, Austrian-American actor (d. 1964)
1899 – Ruth Page, American ballerina and choreographer (d. 1991)

1901–present
1901 – Greta Kempton, Austrian-American painter (d. 1991)
1902 – Johannes Brinkman, Dutch architect, designed the Van Nelle Factory (d. 1949)
  1902   – Madeleine Milhaud, French actress and composer (d. 2008)
1903 – Bill Holman, American cartoonist (d. 1987)
1907 – James M. Gavin, American general and diplomat, United States Ambassador to France (d. 1990)
1908 – Jack Crawford, Australian tennis player (d. 1991)
  1908   – Louis L'Amour, American novelist and short story writer (d. 1988)
1909 – Gabrielle Roy, Canadian author and educator (d. 1983)
1910 – Nicholas Monsarrat, English sailor and author (d. 1979)
1912 – Wilfrid Brambell, Irish actor and performer (d. 1985)
  1912   – Karl Malden, American actor (d. 2009)
  1912   – Agnes Martin, Canadian-American painter and educator (d. 2004)
  1912   – Leslie Johnson, English race car driver (d. 1959)
1913 – Tom McCall, American journalist and politician, 30th Governor of Oregon (d. 1983)
  1913   – Lew Wasserman, American businessman and talent agent (d. 2002)
  1913   – James Westerfield, American actor (d. 1971)
1914 – John Stanley, American author and illustrator (d. 1993)
  1914   – Donald Stokes, Baron Stokes, English businessman (d. 2008)
1917 – Virginia Grey, American actress (d. 2004)
  1917   – Irving Kaplansky, Canadian-American mathematician and academic (d. 2006)
  1917   – Paul Rogers, English actor (d. 2013)
1918 – Cheddi Jagan, Guyanese politician, 4th President of Guyana (d. 1997)
1919 – Bernard Krigstein, American illustrator (d. 1990)
1920 – James Brown, American actor and singer (d. 1992)
  1920   – Werner Klemperer, German-American actor (d. 2000)
  1920   – Lloyd MacPhail, Canadian businessman and politician, 23rd Lieutenant Governor of Prince Edward Island (d. 1995)
  1920   – Fanny Waterman, English pianist and educator, founded the Leeds International Pianoforte Competition (d. 2020)
  1920   – Katsuko Saruhashi, Japanese geochemist (d. 2007)
  1920   – Ross Martin, American actor (d. 1981)
1921 – Nino Manfredi, Italian actor, director, and screenwriter (d. 2004)
1922 – John J. Gilligan, American politician, 62nd Governor of Ohio (d. 2013)
  1922   – Stewart Stern, American screenwriter (d. 2015)
1923 – Marcel Marceau, French mime and actor (d. 2007)
1924 – Al Neuharth, American journalist and author, founded USA Today (d. 2013)
  1924   – Yevgeny Ostashev, Russian test pilot, participant in the launch of the first artificial Earth satellite (d. 1960)
  1924   – Osman F. Seden, Turkish director, producer, and screenwriter (d. 1998)
  1924   – Bill Wendell, American television announcer (d. 1999)
1927 – Marty Blake, American basketball player and manager (d. 2013)
  1927   – Nicolas Tikhomiroff, Russian photographer (d. 2016)
1928 – Carrie Donovan, American journalist (d. 2001)
  1928   – E. D. Hirsch, American author, critic, and academic
  1928   – Ed Macauley, American basketball player, coach, and priest (d. 2011)
1929 – Yayoi Kusama, Japanese artist
  1929   – P. Ramlee, Malaysian actor, director, singer, songwriter, composer, and producer (d. 1973)
1930 – Derek Bok, American lawyer and academic
  1930   – Pat Robertson, American minister and broadcaster, founded the Christian Broadcasting Network
  1930   – Stephen Sondheim, American composer and songwriter (d. 2021)
1931 – Burton Richter, American physicist and academic, Nobel Prize laureate (d. 2018)
  1931   – William Shatner, Canadian actor
  1931   – Leslie Thomas, Welsh journalist and author (d. 2014)
1932 – Els Borst, Dutch physician and politician, Deputy Prime Minister of the Netherlands (d. 2014)
  1932   – Larry Evans, American chess player and journalist (d. 2010)
1933 – Abolhassan Banisadr, Iranian economist and politician, 1st President of Iran (d. 2021)
1934 – May Britt, Swedish actress 
  1934   – Sheila Cameron, English lawyer and judge
  1934   – Orrin Hatch, American lawyer and politician (d. 2022)
1935 – Galina Gavrilovna Korchuganova, Russian-born Soviet test pilot and aerobatics champion (d. 2004)
  1935   – Lea Pericoli, Italian tennis player and journalist
  1935   – Frank Pulli, American baseball player and umpire (d. 2013)
  1935   – M. Emmet Walsh, American actor
1936 – Ron Carey, American trade union leader (d. 2008)
  1936   – Roger Whittaker, Kenyan-English singer-songwriter and guitarist
  1936   – Erol Büyükburç, Turkish singer-songwriter, pop music composer, and actor (d. 2015)
1937 – Angelo Badalamenti, American pianist and composer
  1937   – Armin Hary, German sprinter
  1937   – Jon Hassell, American trumpet player and composer (d. 2021)
  1937   – Foo Foo Lammar, British drag queen (d. 2003)
1938 – Rein Etruk, Estonian chess player (d. 2012)
1940 – Dave Keon, Canadian ice hockey player
  1940   – Haing S. Ngor, Cambodian-American physician and author (d. 1996)
  1940   – George Edward Alcorn, Jr., American physicist and inventor
1941 – Billy Collins, American poet
  1941   – Jeremy Clyde, English singer-songwriter and guitarist 
  1941   – Bruno Ganz, Swiss actor (d. 2019)
  1941   – Cassam Uteem, Mauritian politician, 2nd President of Mauritius
1942 – Jorge Ben Jor, Brazilian singer-songwriter
  1942   – Dick Pound, Canadian lawyer and academic
1943 – George Benson, American singer-songwriter and guitarist 
  1943   – Nazem Ganjapour, Iranian footballer and manager (d. 2013)
  1943   – Keith Relf, English singer-songwriter, guitarist, and producer (d. 1976)
1945 – Eric Roth, American screenwriter and producer
1946 – Don Chaney, American basketball player and coach
  1946   – Rivka Golani, Israeli viola player and composer
  1946   – Rudy Rucker, American mathematician, computer scientist, and author
  1946   – Harry Vanda, Dutch-Australian singer-songwriter, guitarist, and producer 
1947 – George Ferguson, English architect and politician, 1st Mayor of Bristol
  1947   – James Patterson, American author and producer
  1947   – Maarten van Gent, Dutch basketball player and coach
1948 – Wolf Blitzer, American journalist
  1948   – Andrew Lloyd Webber, English composer and director 
1949 – Fanny Ardant, French actress, director, and screenwriter
  1949   – Brian Hanrahan, English journalist (d. 2010)
1952 – Des Browne, Scottish lawyer and politician, Secretary of State for Scotland
  1952   – Bob Costas, American sportscaster
1953 – Kenneth Rogoff, American economist and chess grandmaster
1955 – Lena Olin, Swedish actress
  1955   – Valdis Zatlers, Latvian physician and politician, 7th President of Latvia
  1956   – Maria Teresa, Grand Duchess of Luxembourg (born María Teresa Mestre y Batista)
1957 – Jürgen Bucher, German footballer
  1957   – Stephanie Mills, American actress and singer
1959 – Matthew Modine, American actor, director, producer, and screenwriter
1960 – Jim Covert, American football player
1961 – Simon Furman, British comic book writer
1962 – Nikos Kourbanas, Greek footballer 
1963 – Deborah Bull, English ballerina
  1963   – Susan Ann Sulley, English pop singer
  1963   – Martín Vizcarra, Peruvian engineer and politician, 67th President of Peru
1964 – David Gillespie, Australian rugby league player
1966 – Todd Ewen, Canadian ice hockey player and coach (d. 2015)
  1966   – Artis Pabriks, Latvian academic and politician, 11th Minister for Defence of Latvia
  1966   – António Pinto, Portuguese runner
  1966   – Brian Shaw, American basketball player and coach
1967 – Mario Cipollini, Italian cyclist
  1967   – Bernie Gallacher, Scottish-English footballer (d. 2011)
1969 – Russell Maryland, American football player
1970 – Andreas Johnson, Swedish singer-songwriter
  1970   – Leontien van Moorsel, Dutch cyclist
  1970   – Hwang Young-cho, South Korean runner
1971 – Keegan-Michael Key, American actor, comedian, and writer
1972 – Shawn Bradley, German-American basketball player, coach, and actor
  1972   – Cory Lidle, American baseball player (d. 2006)
  1972   – Elvis Stojko, Canadian figure skater and sportscaster
1973 – Beverley Knight, English singer-songwriter and producer
1974 – Marcus Camby, American basketball player
  1974   – Philippe Clement, Belgian footballer
  1974   – Grigoria Golia, Greek handball player 
  1974   – Geo Meneses, Mexican producer and singer
1975 – Cole Hauser, American actor and producer
  1975   – Jiří Novák, Czech-Monegasque tennis player
1976 – Teun de Nooijer, Dutch field hockey player
  1976   – Asako Toki, Japanese singer-songwriter
  1976   – Reese Witherspoon, American actress and producer
1977 – Joey Porter, American football player and coach
  1977   – Tom Poti, American ice hockey player
1979 – Michalis Kouinelis, Greek hip hop singer 
  1979   – Aaron North, American guitarist 
  1979   – Juan Uribe, Dominican baseball player
1981 – Arne Gabius, German runner
  1981   – Mims, American rapper
1982 – Piá, Brazilian footballer
  1982   – Enrico Gasparotto, Italian cyclist
  1982   – Michael Janyk, Canadian skier
  1982   – Constance Wu, American actress
1983 – Thomas Davis Sr., American football player
1984 – Piotr Trochowski, German footballer
1985 – Mayola Biboko, Belgian footballer
  1985   – Jakob Fuglsang, Danish cyclist
  1985   – Justin Masterson, American baseball player
  1985   – Kelli Waite, Australian swimmer
1986 – Dexter Fowler, American baseball player
1987 – Ike Davis, American baseball player
  1987   – Jairo Mora Sandoval, Costa Rican environmentalist (d. 2013)
  1987   – Liam Doran, British rallycross driver
1989 – Ruben Popa, Romanian footballer
  1989   – J. J. Watt, American football player
1994 – Edwin Díaz, Puerto Rican baseball player
  1994   – Aliaksandra Sasnovich, Belarusian tennis player
2000 – Dimitrios Meliopoulos, Greek footballer

Deaths

Pre-1600
 235 – Severus Alexander, Roman emperor (b. 208) 
 880 – Carloman of Bavaria, Frankish king
1144 – William of Norwich, child murder victim
1322 – Thomas, 2nd Earl of Lancaster, English politician, Lord High Steward of England (b. 1278)
1418 – Dietrich of Nieheim, German bishop and historian (b. 1345)
1421 – Thomas of Lancaster, 1st Duke of Clarence, English soldier and politician, Lord High Steward of England (b. 1388)
1454 – John Kemp, Archbishop of Canterbury
1471 – George of Poděbrady (b. 1420)

1601–1900
1544 – Johannes Magnus, Swedish archbishop and theologian (b. 1488)
1602 – Agostino Carracci, Italian painter and educator (b. 1557)
1685 – Emperor Go-Sai of Japan (b. 1638)
1687 – Jean-Baptiste Lully, Italian-French composer and conductor (b. 1632)
1758 – Jonathan Edwards, English minister, theologian, and philosopher (b. 1703)
1772 – John Canton, English physicist and academic (b. 1718)
1820 – Stephen Decatur, American commander (b. 1779)
1832 – Johann Wolfgang von Goethe, German novelist, poet, playwright, and diplomat (b. 1749)
1840 – Étienne Bobillier, French mathematician and academic (b. 1798)
1864 – Konstanty Kalinowski, writer, journalist, lawyer and revolutionary (b. 1838)
1881 – Samuel Courtauld, English businessman (b. 1793)
1896 – Thomas Hughes, English lawyer and politician (b. 1822)

1901–present
1913 – Song Jiaoren, Chinese educator and politician (b. 1882)
  1913   – Ruggero Oddi,  Italian physiologist and anatomist (b.1864)
1924 – William Macewen, Scottish surgeon and neuroscientist (b. 1848)
1931 – James Campbell, 1st Baron Glenavy, Irish lawyer and politician (b. 1851)
1942 – Frederick Cuming, English cricketer (b. 1875)
  1942   – William Donne, English captain and cricketer (b. 1875)
1945 – John Hessin Clarke, American lawyer and judge (b. 1857)
1952 – D. S. Senanayake, 1st Prime Minister of Sri Lanka (b. 1883)
1955 – Ivan Šubašić, Croatian lawyer and politician, 23rd Prime Minister of Yugoslavia (b. 1892)
1958 – Mike Todd, American film producer (b. 1909)
1960 – José Antonio Aguirre, Spanish lawyer and politician, 1st President of the Basque Country (b. 1904)
1966 – John Harlin, American mountaineer and pilot (b. 1935)
1971 – Johannes Villemson, Estonian-American runner (b. 1893)
  1971   – Nella Walker, American actress and vaudevillian (b. 1886)
1974 – Peter Revson, American race car driver (b. 1939)
  1974   – Orazio Satta Puliga, Italian automobile designer (b. 1910)
1976 – John Dwyer McLaughlin, American painter (b. 1898)
1977 – A. K. Gopalan, Indian educator and politician (b. 1904)
1978 – Karl Wallenda, German-American acrobat and tightrope walker, founded The Flying Wallendas (b. 1905)
1979 – Ben Lyon, American actor and studio executive (b. 1901)
1981 – James Elliott, American runner and coach (b. 1915)
  1981   – Gil Puyat,  Filipino businessman and politician, 13th President of the Senate of the Philippines (b. 1907)
1985 – Raoul Ubac, French painter, sculptor, photographer, and engraver (b. 1910)
  1985   – Spyros Vassiliou, Greek painter, printmaker, illustrator, and stage designer (b. 1903)  
1986 – Olive Deering, American actress (b. 1918)
  1986   – Mark Dinning, American singer (b. 1933)
1987 – Odysseas Angelis, Greek general and politician (b. 1912)
1989 – Peta Taylor, English cricketer (b. 1912)
1990 – Gerald Bull, Canadian engineer and academic (b. 1928)
1991 – Léon Balcer, Canadian lawyer and politician, 19th Solicitor General of Canada (b. 1917)
  1991   – Paul Engle, American novelist, poet, playwright, and critic (b. 1908)
  1991   – Dave Guard, American singer-songwriter and guitarist  (b. 1934)
  1991   – Gloria Holden, English-American actress (b. 1908)
1993 – Steve Olin, American baseball player (b. 1965)
1994 – Dan Hartman, American singer-songwriter, and producer (b. 1950)
  1994   – Walter Lantz, American animator, director, and producer (b. 1899)
1996 – Don Murray, American drummer (b. 1945)
  1996   – Robert F. Overmyer, American colonel, pilot, and astronaut (b. 1936)
  1996   – Billy Williamson, American guitarist (b. 1925)
1999 – Max Beloff, Baron Beloff, English historian and academic (b. 1913)
  1999   – David Strickland, American actor (b. 1969)
2000 – Carlo Parola, Italian footballer and manager (b. 1921)
2001 – Stepas Butautas, Lithuanian basketball player and coach (b. 1925)
  2001   – Sabiha Gökçen, Turkish soldier and pilot (b. 1913)
  2001   – William Hanna, American animator, director, producer, and voice actor, co-founded Hanna-Barbera (b. 1910)
  2001   – Robert Fletcher Shaw, Canadian businessman, academic, and civil servant (b. 1910)
2002 – Rudolf Baumgartner, Swiss violinist and conductor (b. 1917)
2003 – Terry Lloyd, English journalist (b. 1952)
2004 – Janet Akyüz Mattei, Turkish-American astronomer and academic (b. 1943)
  2004   – Ahmed Yassin, Co-founded Hamas (b. 1937)
2004 – V. M. Tarkunde, Indian lawyer and civil rights activist (b. 1909) 
2005 – Rod Price, English guitarist and songwriter (b. 1947)
  2005   – Gemini Ganesan, Indian film actor (b. 1920)
  2005   – Kenzō Tange, Japanese architect, designed the Yoyogi National Gymnasium and Hiroshima Peace Memorial Museum (b. 1913)
2006 – Pierre Clostermann, French soldier, pilot, and politician (b. 1921)
  2006   – Pío Leyva, Cuban singer and author (b. 1917)
  2006   – Kurt von Trojan, Austrian-Australian journalist and author (b. 1937)
2007 – U. G. Krishnamurti, Indian-Italian philosopher and educator (b. 1918)
2008 – Cachao López, Cuban-American bassist and composer (b. 1918)
2010 – James Black, Scottish biologist and pharmacologist, Nobel Prize laureate (b. 1924)
  2010   – Özhan Canaydın, Turkish basketball player and businessman (b. 1943)
2011 – Artur Agostinho, Portuguese journalist (b. 1920)
  2011   – Victor Bouchard, Canadian pianist and composer (b. 1926)
2012 – Joe Blanchard, American football player and wrestler (b. 1928)
  2012   – John Payton, American lawyer and activist (b. 1946)
  2012   – Matthew White Ridley, 4th Viscount Ridley, English academic and politician, Lord Lieutenant of Northumberland (b. 1925)
  2012   – Mickey Sullivan, American baseball player and coach (b. 1932)
  2012   – David Waltz, American computer scientist and academic (b. 1943)
  2012   – Neil L. Whitehead, English anthropologist and author (b. 1956)
2013 – Vladimír Čech, Czech actor and politician (b. 1951)
  2013   – James Nabrit, American lawyer and academic (b. 1932)
  2013   – Bebo Valdés, Cuban-Swedish pianist and composer (b. 1918)
  2013   – Derek Watkins, English trumpet player and composer (b. 1945)
  2013   – Ray Williams, American basketball player and coach (b. 1954)
2014 – Yashwant Vithoba Chittal, Indian author (b. 1928)
  2014   – Mickey Duff, Polish-English boxer and manager (b. 1929)
  2014   – Thor Listau, Norwegian soldier and politician (b. 1938)
  2014   – Tasos Mitsopoulos, Cypriot politician, Cypriot Minister of Defence (b. 1965)
2015 – Arkady Arkanov, Ukrainian-Russian actor and playwright (b. 1933)
  2015   – Horst Buhtz, German footballer and manager (b. 1923)
  2015   – Norman Scribner, American pianist, composer, and conductor (b. 1936)
2016 – Phife Dawg, American rapper (b. 1970)
  2016   – Rob Ford, Canadian businessman and politician, 64th Mayor of Toronto (b. 1969)
  2016   – Rita Gam, American actress (b. 1927)
2018 – Johan van Hulst, Dutch politician, academic and author, Yad Vashem recipient (b. 1911)
2019 – Scott Walker, British-American singer-songwriter (b. 1943)

Holidays and observances
Bihar Day (Bihar, India)
Christian feast day:
Basil of Ancyra
Blessed Clemens August Graf von Galen
Darerca of Ireland
Epaphroditus
Jonathan Edwards (Lutheranism)
Lea of Rome
Nicholas Owen
Paul of Narbonne
March 22 (Eastern Orthodox liturgics)
Earliest day on which Easter Sunday can fall (last in 1818, will not happen again until 2285), while April 25 is the latest. (Christianity)
Emancipation Day or Día de la Abolición de la Esclavitud (Puerto Rico)
World Water Day (International)

References

External links

 BBC: On This Day
 
 Historical Events on March 22

Days of the year
March